Black Reign is the third studio album by American rapper Queen Latifah, released in 1993. Black Reign was her most successful album up to that point, peaking at number 60 on the Billboard 200. The album also peaked at number fifteen on the Top R&B/Hip-Hop Albums. The album sold in excess of 500,000 copies, achieving gold status.

Critical reception
Trouser Press wrote that Latifah "rhymes over bottom-booming jeep beats and sings to sweet soul, dancehall and, in the case of 'Winki’s Theme,' a song for her late brother, a live jazz quartet." The New York Times wrote: "As one of hip-hop's true vocal virtuosos, Queen Latifah tosses off articulate, quick-changing syncopations when she raps, slipping in and out of a Jamaican accent and singing melodic choruses in a sweet, strong voice."

Track listing

Music videos
 "U.N.I.T.Y."
 "Just Another Day"
 "Black Hand Side"
 "I Can't Understand"
 "Weekend Love"

Influence

The album was a major influence for young adult novelist Jason Reynolds, who was inspired to start writing poetry when he discovered Black Reign at nine years old.

Certifications

References 

1993 albums
Motown albums
Queen Latifah albums
Vocal jazz albums